Aaron Kipkirui Cheruiyot, MGH( born 23 February 1986) is a Kenyan politician. He was elected as senator for Kericho County succeeding Charles Keter who had resigned to take up a cabinet portfolio. He was elected majority leader of the senate in 2022.

Early years and education 
Aaron Cheruiyot was born in 1986. He grew up in Kericho County. He undertook his primary and secondary education at Unity Primary school and Kericho High School respectively, before proceeding to Moi University in Eldoret where he acquired a BA degree specialising in Language and Literary studies. In 2010 he joined the Kenya Institute of Management and acquired a Diploma in Marketing.

Family
He is married to his longtime girlfriend Lenah. The couple are blessed with a lovely daughter Maria.

References 

Living people
Members of the Senate of Kenya
1986 births
Moi University alumni
People from Kericho County